Navin Kartik is an American economist. He is a professor of economics at Columbia University.

Biography 
Kartik received his B.A. from Brandeis University and Ph.D. from Stanford University. He was a member of the Institute for Advanced Study from 2007 to 2008. He taught at University of California, San Diego from 2004 to 2009 before joining the Columbia faculty. His research has focused on applied game theory and political economy.

Kartik was elected a fellow of the Econometric Society in 2022. He was also a recipient of a Sloan Research Fellowship in 2010.

References 

Living people
American economists
Econometricians
Columbia University faculty
University of California, San Diego faculty
Sloan Research Fellows
Institute for Advanced Study people
Brandeis University alumni
Stanford University alumni
Game theorists
Political economists
Year of birth missing (living people)